Nathaniel Chipman (November 15, 1752February 13, 1843) was an American politician who served as a United States Senator from Vermont and Chief Justice of the Vermont Supreme Court.  A Yale College graduate and  Continental Army veteran of the American Revolution, Chipman became a prominent attorney and advocate for Vermont statehood.  When Vermont was admitted to the Union, he served as the first judge of the United States District Court for the District of Vermont.

After Vermont became the fourteenth state, Chipman became a leader of its Federalist Party.  In addition to his legal and political work, Chipman authored several works on government and law, served for 28 years as Professor of Law at Middlebury College, and was a satirical poet.

Education and career

Born on November 15, 1752, in Salisbury, Connecticut Colony, British America, Chipman was privately tutored and graduated from Yale University in 1777. He served as a lieutenant in the Continental Army during the American Revolutionary War from 1777 to 1778. He was admitted to the bar and entered private practice in Tinmouth, Vermont Republic from 1779 to 1784, and from 1785 to 1787. He was a state's attorney in Montpelier, Vermont Republic from 1781 to 1785. He was a member of the Vermont House of Representatives from 1784 to 1785. He was a justice of the Supreme Court of Vermont from 1787 to 1789, and served as chief justice from 1790 to 1791.

Role in admission of Vermont to the Union

On February 9, 1791, Chipman met with President George Washington to notify him officially of Vermont's decision to apply for admission to the Union as the 14th state. New York had long objected to the existence of the government of Vermont on the grounds that Vermont was part of New York, a position that dated back to a pre-Revolutionary War dispute between the colonial governors of New York and New Hampshire over the right to sell Vermont land grants. In 1790, New York agreed to give up its claim provided that an agreement on the boundary between Vermont and New York could be concluded. In consideration of New York giving up its claim to Vermont, Vermont paid $30,000 as an indemnity to owners of Vermont land who had received their grants from New York (about $800,000 in 2015). On February 18, 1791, Congress decided to admit Vermont to the Union, effective March 4, 1791.

Federal judicial service

He was confirmed by the United States Senate on March 4, 1791, and received his commission the same day. He resigned on January 1, 1793. Later, he authored the book Sketches of the Principles of Government

State service

Following his resignation from the federal bench, Chipman resumed private practice in Tinmouth from 1793 to 1796. He served as chief justice of the Supreme Court of Vermont from 1796 to 1798.

Congressional service

Chipman was elected as a Federalist from Vermont to the United States Senate to fill the vacancy caused by the resignation of United States Senator Isaac Tichenor and served from October 17, 1797 until March 3, 1803. He was an unsuccessful candidate for reelection.

Later career

Following his departure from Congress, Chipman resumed practicing law in Tinmouth. He was a member of the Vermont House of Representatives from 1806 to 1809 and in 1811. He was a member of the Vermont Council of Censors in 1813. He was chief justice of the Supreme Court of Vermont from 1813 to 1815. He was a Professor of law at Middlebury College starting in 1816.

Death

Chipman died on February 17, 1843, in Tinmouth. He was interred in Tinmouth Cemetery.

Family

Chipman was the brother of Daniel Chipman, a United States representative from Vermont, and the grandfather of John Logan Chipman, a United States Representative from Michigan, In 1781, Chipman married Sarah Hill (1762–1831), they had six children, including Henry C. Chipman. Another son, Jeffrey Chipman, was a Justice of the Peace in Canandaigua, New York in the 1820s, and was the jurist from whom those attempting to prevent William Morgan from publishing a book opposing Freemasonry obtained an arrest warrant for Morgan, which eventually led to Morgan's disappearance and presumed death and the founding of the Anti-Masonic Party.

Chipman was the grandfather of John W. Brownson, a member of the New York State Senate.  Brownson was the son of Dr. John Brownson and Nathaniel Chipman's daughter Laura.

References

Sources
 The Life of Nathaniel Chipman, by Daniel Chipman, Kessinger Publishing, LLC (November 26, 2008)

External links

 
  Service record from Francis B. Heitman's Historical Register of Officers of the Continental Army
 The Political Graveyard
 Encyclopedia, Vermont Biography
 
 Govtrack. US Congress

1752 births
1843 deaths
People from Salisbury, Connecticut
People of colonial Connecticut
American people of English descent
Federalist Party United States senators from Vermont
Vermont Federalists
Members of the Vermont House of Representatives
People from Rutland County, Vermont
State's attorneys in Vermont
Judges of the United States District Court for the District of Vermont
Chief Justices of the Vermont Supreme Court
United States federal judges appointed by George Washington
18th-century American judges
Vermont lawyers
Yale College alumni
Continental Army officers from Connecticut
Burials in Vermont